Joseph Tartakovsky (born December 10, 1981) is an American lawyer, writer, and historian, and the former Deputy Solicitor General of Nevada. Tartakovsky is presently an Assistant United States Attorney in the United States Attorney's Office for the Northern District of California in San Francisco where he prosecutes criminal cases.
  
He is the author two books: The Lives of the Constitution: Ten Exceptional Minds that Shaped America’s Supreme Law (2018) and No Way Home: The Crisis of Homelessness and How to Fix It with Intelligence and Humanity (2021).  His book, The Lives of the Constitution, became a #1 bestseller on Amazon.com in the three areas: constitutional law, legal history, and legal biography.  

His writings have appeared in publications that include the New York Times, Wall Street Journal, the Los Angeles Times, and Forbes.  He has been a guest on C-SPAN's Washington Journal.  C-SPAN's Book TV featured a book release event for The Lives of the Constitution in Washington, D.C.

A video featuring Tartakovsky and based on his book's chapter on Alexander Hamilton, filmed by PragerU, has received over 1.6 million views on YouTube.

Career history
Joseph Tartakovsky served as a law clerk to Judge Paul K. Kelly, Jr., of the United States Court of Appeals for the Tenth Circuit. He was an associate at Gibson Dunn & Crutcher LLC, an international law firm, in San Francisco, where he practiced in criminal defense and civil litigation.

Magazine editor 
At the Claremont Institute for the Study of Statesmanship and Political Philosophy, he was a Contributing Editor at the Claremont Review of Books and later the James Wilson Fellow in Constitutional Law.

Nevada Deputy Solicitor General 
In 2015, he was appointed Nevada's first Deputy Solicitor General by Adam Laxalt.  He served until 2018. In that position he helped oversee Nevada's legal strategy for major litigation in state and federal courts, and advised the Nevada Attorney General and Nevada Governor on matters of statewide importance.

He also helped handle Nevada's docket in the United States Supreme Court and other appeals courts. He has argued and litigated cases on a variety of issues that include education, public lands, free speech, ERISA, gun background checks, and elections.  He argued numerous appeals in the U.S. Court of Appeals for the Ninth Circuit and Nevada Supreme Court. He has been counsel of record in the United States Supreme Court.

Private practice and author 

In 2018, he published The Lives of the Constitution: Ten Exceptional Minds that Shaped America’s Supreme Law (2018).

Tartakovsky later returned to the appellate and constitutional practice at the law firm of Gibson, Dunn & Crutcher in San Francisco, where he practiced constitutional law.  While there, he was part of the team challenging, before the U.S. Supreme Court, the decision in Martin v. City of Boise, in which the U.S. Court of Appeals for the Ninth Circuit that held that anti-camping laws, under certain circumstances, violate the Cruel and Unusual Punishments Clause.  The decision remains the subject of debate in cities across the West.

In 2019 he was named the Pacific Research Institute's Adjunct Fellow in Legal Studies.

In March 2021, he published a second book, No Way Home: The Crisis of Homelessness and How to Fix It with Intelligence and Humanity, as one of four co-authors.

Federal prosecutor 
As a federal prosecutor, he has handled cases involving drug trafficking, firearms, cyberstalking, theft of endangered species, embezzlement, and child sexual exploitation, among other offenses.

References 

1981 births
Living people
University of California, Santa Barbara alumni
Fordham University School of Law alumni
California lawyers
21st-century American historians
21st-century American male writers
Historians of the United States
Legal historians
People associated with Gibson Dunn
American male non-fiction writers